The Cambodia national under-23 football team is the under-23 football team representing Cambodia at the Olympic Games, Asian Games, and Southeast Asian Games. It is administered by the Football Federation of Cambodia.

Competition records

Asian Games
 Champions   Runners up   Third place   Fourth place

SEA Games Record
 Champions   Runners up   Third place   Fourth place

Since 2001, Football at the Southeast Asian Games changed into an Under-23 tournament.

Schedules and results

2019

2021

2022

Coaching staff

Players

Current squad
The following 24 players were called up for 2023 Merlion Cup.

|-----
! colspan=9 style="background:#000080" align="left" |
|----- bgcolor="#DFEDFD"

|-----
! colspan=9 style="background:#000080" align="left" |
|----- bgcolor="#DFEDFD"

|-----
! colspan=9 style="background:#000080" align="left" |
|----- bgcolor="#DFEDFD"

Recent call-ups
The following players have been called up.

INJ Withdrew due to injury
PRE Preliminary squad / standby
RET Retired from the national team
SUS Serving suspension
WD Player withdrew from the squad due to non-injury issue.

Honours
 BIDC Cup 
  Champions (1): 2009
 Southeast Asian Games 
 Fourth Place: 2019

See also

Leagues
 Cambodian Premier League
 Cambodian League 2

Cups
 Hun Sen Cup
 CNCC League Cup
 Cambodian Super Cup

National teams
Men
 Cambodia national football team
 Cambodia national under-21 football team
 Cambodia national under-17 football team
Women
 Cambodia women's national football team
Futsal
 Cambodia national futsal team

Other
 Football in Cambodia
 Cambodian Football Federation

References

under
Asian national under-23 association football teams